Okanagan—Similkameen—Merritt  was a federal electoral district in British Columbia, Canada, that was represented in the House of Commons of Canada from 1988 to 1997.

This riding was created in 1987 from Okanagan—Similkameen, and eliminated in 1996 when it was divided between Okanagan—Coquihalla and West Kootenay—Okanagan.

The riding consisted of the west part of the Kootenay Boundary Regional District, the Okanagan-Similkameen Regional District, Electoral Areas M and N of the Thompson-Nicola Regional District, and the city of Merritt.

Members of Parliament

Election results

See also 

 List of Canadian federal electoral districts
 Past Canadian electoral districts

External links 
Riding history from the Library of Parliament

Former federal electoral districts of British Columbia